The 1956 Holy Cross Crusaders football team was an American football team that represented the College of the Holy Cross as an independent during the 1956 NCAA University Division football season. In its 13th year under head coach Eddie Anderson, the team compiled a 5–3–1 record. The team played its home games at Fitton Field on the college's campus in Worcester, Massachusetts.

Schedule

Statistical leaders 
Statistical leaders for the 1956 Crusaders included:
 Rushing: Dick Surrette, 168 yards and 2 touchdowns on 53 attempts
 Passing: Bill Smithers, 699 yards, 44 completions and 8 touchdowns on 87 attempts
 Receiving: Dick Arcand, 200 yards and 4 touchdowns on 13 receptions
 Scoring: Dick Arcand, 24 points on 4 touchdowns
 Total offense: Bill Smithers, 796 yards (699 passing, 97 rushing)
 All-purpose yards: Dick Surrette, 252 yards (168 rushing, 84 receiving)

References

Holy Cross
Holy Cross Crusaders football seasons
Holy Cross Crusaders football